Kokanee Glacier Provincial Park is one of the oldest provincial parks in British Columbia, established in 1922. The park has three glaciers (Kokanee, Caribou, and Woodbury) that feed over 30 alpine lakes which are the headwaters of many creeks.

There are five access roads entering the park, which were developed as mining and forestry roads along the major drainages. The nearest towns are Nelson, Ainsworth, Kaslo and Slocan City (access is primarily from Nelson and Kaslo). Pierre Trudeau's youngest son, Michel, was killed in an avalanche in 1998 while skiing at the park.

IUCN Category II

The International Union for Conservation of Nature (IUCN) has designated Kokanee Glacier Park as a category II protected area (national park), though it is actually administered by the provincial government of British Columbia.

Grays Peak
Grays Peak is a prominent mountain in the park. Named after Robert Hampton Gray (VC) and his brother, John Balfour Gray, the peak is notable as the mountain featured on the label of Kokanee beer.

See also
Kokanee (disambiguation)
Kokanee Creek Provincial Park
Valhalla Provincial Park

References

External links

 
Map of the park's location in SE British Columbia (BC Parks website)

Glaciers of British Columbia
Provincial parks of British Columbia
West Kootenay
1922 establishments in British Columbia
Protected areas established in 1922
Kootenay Land District